The Priboiasa is a right tributary of the river Păscoaia in Romania. It flows into the Păscoaia north of Săliștea.

Tributaries

The following rivers are tributaries to the river Priboiasa (from source to mouth):

Left: Stâna, Sturii Mari, Sturii Mici, Găina, Calul, Vladimiru
Right: Mlaca Fântânii, Căprioara, Totușca Mare, Totușca Mică, Bradu, Clăbuceasa, Poarta, Pleșu

References

Rivers of Romania
Rivers of Vâlcea County